Count Vasily Vasilyevich Orlov-Denisov (8 September 1775 – 24 January 1843) was a Cossack Russian general. He was the son of Vasily Petrovich Orlov, Ataman of the Don Cossacks, and grandson (on his mother's side) of the first Earl of the Cossacks, General of Cavalry, Fedor Petrovich Denisov . In honour of his grandfather he added his surname to his own, becoming Orlov-Denisov on 26 April 1801.

He is depicted in Leo Tolstoy's novel War and Peace.

References

External links 
The Dictionary of Russian Generals in Napoleonic Wars. 

1775 births
1843 deaths
Russian commanders of the Napoleonic Wars
Don Cossacks
Russian nobility
Cavalry commanders